Szécsény  is a town in Nógrád county, Hungary.

Etymology
The name comes from the Slavic sečь: cutting (Sečany). 1219/1550 Scecen.

History 
The valley of the Ipoly and especially the area of that around Szécsény was inhabited even in the prehistoric age. Findings attest that the region was peopled from the Neolithic period. Teutons, Avars, and Slavs appeared here in the first millennium BC.

Hungarians settled down in the surrounding country in the decades following the Hungarian Conquest, which began in AD 895. The town itself must have originated from that era. The burial places found on the confines of the town render this pretension probable.

The first genuine written document about Szécsény dates back to 1219. In 1334, Lord Chief Justice Thomas Szécsényi induced King Charles Robert to permit the status of town, so Szécsény became a market town in the same year.

The Turkish occupied Szécsény in 1552 under the name "Seçen" and after that the town became the center of a sanjak for several decades. The first Turkish occupation ended in 1593, whereupon Zsigmond Forgách became the landed proprietor of the town and the captain of the fortress at the same time. The second Turkish occupation lasted 20 years. Szécsény became practically deserted by the end of the nearly 150-year Turkish rule.

One of the most glorious parts of the town history is linked with the war of independence in 1703 that was called into being against Habsburgs by Prince Ferenc Rákóczi II. The Prince convened the Diet into our town in September 1705, where he was elected the ruling Prince of Transylvania and commander-in chief of the Hungarian insurgent forces. Although the war of independence failed, the inhabitants of the town still treasure the Prince's memory. Many town institutions bear his name.

1737 is a remarkable date in the life of the town as the Forgách repurchased their property from Koháry family. The town began a slow development in the 18th century, a lot of private houses were built and the first pharmacy of the county was opened in 1741. The baroque style Forgách Castle - which is a museum nowadays - was built in that century as well.

The development of the town slowed down in the 19th century and fell behind other towns in Nógrád, such as Balassagyarmat, Losonc, Salgótarján. Szécsény lost its town status in 1886 owing to the decision of Parliament. In spite of the situation, a town hall was built in 1905 and the municipality organized a brilliant commemorative Rákóczi festival on the 200th anniversary of the 1705 Diet.

After the Treaty of Trianon in 1920, following the First World War, Szécsény became a frontier town, which has hindered its development until the present day. The Second World War did not keep out of Szécsény's way either. During the fighting raging in December 1944, the inhabitants suffered greatly.

After the conclusion of the war, the reorganization of life started immediately. Nationalization and collectivization brought fundamental changes in everyday life.

Until the end of the 1970s, Szécsény was an administrative center, being the chief town of the district. When the public administration system was reformed, the function of the seat of the district became extinct. As a result, several institutions and offices were closed down, e.g. the district court, the title registry, the central police station, and the high school.

The recession in the 1990s also damaged the local economy, but significant improvements in infrastructure were
carried out, including sewer and gas networks and connection to the national telephone network.

The institutions of the town also have changed. A second high school was founded in 1994, along with an ambulance station and nursing home. The agricultural vocational school and the art school, though, were transferred to the county seat.

Geography & Geology
Szécsény lies in the northern part of Nógrád county on the Slovak border, at the edge of the Ipoly valley. The major part of the town was built on a plateau extending along the southern edge of the basin. The north–south flow of the river turns into east–west nearby.

Its geographical position is 48° 5" N, 19° 32" E.

The Szentlélek ("Holy Spirit") is a stream running through the town along the edge of the plateau and flowing into the Ipoly. On the confines of the settlement, there is a pond originating from ballast-digging.

Climatic features
Szécsény has a continental climate of wetter type. The average number of
sunny hours is 1,990 a year.
basis of the yearly average in the last 70 years. The annual rainfall is  - taking the yearly average of 50 years as a basis. The prevailing winds are westerly and northwestly. In Szécsény, the all-time record in the range of daily temperatures in Hungary of 31.1 °C was recorded on March 23, 2022, with a minimum temperature of -7.5 °C and a maximum temperature of 23.6 °C.

Geological features
The plough-lands in the Ipoly valley are of good quality, they are suitable
for agricultural production. The soil of hills surrounding the valley is of
poorer quality but the plateau is under crop.
The major part of the soil is medium or high acidic. The most frequent type
is brown alluvial forest soil. Quite a large area is covered by 'kovárvány'
brown forest soil (sandy brown forest soil with thin interstratified layers
of colloid and sesquioxide accumulation), chernozem-brown forest soil and
brown earth. Meadow and meadow alluvial soils are typical along the Ipoly.
Sporadically, loess and sand can be found. The average gold crown value of
the cropland (measurement unit of the quality of arable land in Hungary) is
24.97 per hectare, which is below the national average.
Infrastructure
After the transformation of regime the town assigned a substantial sum for
extension the public utility services to 100%. Every property of the settlement has
accessibility to piped water and sewage network as well as to pipeline gas.
Szécsény is the traffic junction of the neighbouring villages. Varsány,
Nógrádsipek, Rimóc can be approached just via our town.
Budapest. Several bus services are available to Budapest every day but there
is a railway line too.
Because of the investments of the past years, the roads maintained by the
local government got damaged. The municipal corporation is planning to carry
out a road reconstruction and intends to finance it steadily.

On the basis of treaty between Hungarian and Slovak Government, in Postenypuszta,
which belongs to Szecseny, the building of a bridge on river Ipoly will begin soon.
Thus, the bordercross traffic, which has not worked since the World War II, will be
reestabilished.

Culture
The community centre co-ordinates and organises the cultural life of the
town. We have several traditional festivals: Town Day at the end of May or
at the beginning of June, Autumn Art Exhibition of Szécsény and Szécsény
Vintage Festival. The cultural centre sponsors the Ferenc Erkel mixed-voice
choir that has been performing for 30 years. There is a projection in the
building once a week. The kindergarteners and school children regularly
watch different educational and entertaining films there.
The town library works within the framework of the cultural centre. Readers
can choose from 44 thousand volumes. The number of the registered readers is
nearly 2,000.

Education, school system
The local government maintains the following educational institutions:
- Kindergarten: The teachers do high quality pedagogic work in the three
buildings of the nursery school.
- Ferenc Rákóczi II Elementary School: It has one building. Owing to the
high-standard didactic and educational work, pupils won several inter-school
competitions.
- Sándor Kırösi Csoma Secondary Grammar and Vocational School: The municipal
corporation founded it in 1994 as an 8-grade secondary grammar school. The
vocational education of computer technology began in 1998. Teaching foreign
languages and computer science have -outstanding - importance.
The following institutions are maintained by the county self-government:
- The School of Arts: The music section is fairly successful. The members of
the dramatic group regularly perform at the town festivities.
- Béla Lipthay Agricultural Secondary Vocational School: This technical
school trains agricultural skilled workers. The students come not only from
Nógrád but also from other counties as well. The school also organises
courses for adults and courses adjusted to the trade, too.
Social welfare, healthcare, unemployment
Three general practitioners and two paediatricians work in Szécsény as
entrepreneurs. There are four dentists. The dentists also attend the
inhabitants of 12 villages in the region of Szécsény. Besides basic
healthcare a small laboratory, physical therapy and therapeutic gymnastics
are available as well. There is a gynaecological consultation too but it
is a private practice.
More and more people appeal to holistic medicine practitioners whose work is
co-ordinated by one of the paediatricians in the framework of a medical
centre.
The ambulance station has been working since 1993. Its job is confined to
transporting patients. The emergency service is operated by an enterprise
owned by a doctor.
Social welfare
The present data of the unemployment show that approximately 1,000
inhabitants are entitled to a form of social allocations the major part of
which is financed by the local authority.
Unemployment
Our figures, which were published by the Employment Centre of Nógrád County,
relate to Szécsény and its region. The number of the registered unemployed:
1,625, including 896 men and 729 women. Manual workers: 1,429 people, not
manual, white-collar workers: 196 people.
Professional grouping:
- Skilled worker: 425
- Semi-skilled labourer: 507
- Unskilled worker or handyman: 520
Classification according to educational level:
- fewer than 8 elementary grades: 245
- 8-grade elementary school: 688
- trade school: 392
- technical school: 24
- technical academy: 40
- vocational technical school: 130
- secondary grammar school: 86
- college, university: 20
Agriculture
As a consequence of the Act of Co-operative farms 1992, one of the best
co-operative farms of the country was liquidated in Szécsény and was
succeeded by a number of collective and private farms. They work in the
agricultural sector and deal with cultivation first of all. The
traditionally grown plants are: potato, maize, sunflower and grain crop.

The collective farms are raising cows at present as well as sheep. Growing
number of private farmers keep horses too. The majority of the landowners
This area supplies their household mainly.
There are few private or collective farmers who run a farm bigger than 50
hectares.
Industry
The biggest employer of the town is Eurocandle Ltd., the owners of which are
Danish entrepreneurs. They employ 300 people and export their products. The
other important industrial company, the Tommy Invest Ltd. gives work to 280
workers.
Several building entrepreneurs work in the town. There are two important
factories: furniture and packing machines ones. A lot of trading companies
work in our town. The most significant of them is Palóc-Coop Ltd. The local
government is revising the tax on practice of a trade, the amount of which
is 2,0%.
Religion
The majority of the inhabitants are Roman Catholic, the minority is
Lutheran. The practice of the Catholic religion is helped by Franciscan
friars who live in the local Franciscan monastery, founded in 1339. The
Clarissa nuns (Franciscan Order of Poor Clares) undertake the task of
nursing of great importance.
Ethnic minorities
The Gypsy Minority Self-government has been working in the town since 1994.
Their aim is to preserve and protect the Gypsy traditions. The mayor's
office supports their work and supplies the material conditions for them.
Tourism

The tourism has not made the most of the potentials of the town yet. The
local authority maintains a Tourinform office, which works together with the
Handicrfts’ Society in the renovted building of Handicraftsman's House. All
visitors get a free brochure about Szécsény and its surrounding.
The town has developed the buildings of the historic part of the town
turning the historical values of Szécsény to account. We used European Union
resources for fulfilment of this task. The display of the unique historic
relics will be advanced when we form closer co-operation with the Franciscan
order.

Source:
szecseny town's webpage

Twin towns – sister cities
Szécsény is twinned with:
 Fiľakovo, Slovakia 
 Kováčovce, Slovakia 
 Niepołomice, Poland
 Warta, Poland

Picture gallery

References

External links

  in Hungarian
 Street map 
 Aerial photographs

Populated places in Nógrád County